Edward James (November 26, 1825 – October 15, 1909) was a millwright and political figure in Nova Scotia, Canada. He represented Lunenburg County in the Nova Scotia House of Assembly from 1878 to 1882 as a Liberal-Conservative member.

Early life
He was born and educated in Lunenburg, Nova Scotia, the son of Arthur James and Mary Ann Ernst. James served as captain in the local militia. He lived at Mahone Bay. James ran unsuccessfully for a seat in the provincial assembly in 1874.

Death
He died in Lunenburg at the age of 83.

Personal life
His grandfather, also named Edward James, also served as a member of the legislative assembly. In 1853, he married Eliza Lantz.

References 
The Canadian parliamentary companion and annual register, 1879, CH Mackintosh 
 A Directory of the Members of the Legislative Assembly of Nova Scotia, 1758-1958, Public Archives of Nova Scotia (1958)

1825 births
1909 deaths
Progressive Conservative Association of Nova Scotia MLAs
People from Lunenburg County, Nova Scotia